Shaver Lake may refer to:

 Shaver Lake,  reservoir
 Shaver Lake (Arkansas), a lake in Cross County, Arkansas
 Shaver Lake, California
 Shaver Lake Heights, California